The Antelope air defense system is a Taiwanese short range ground-to-air anti-aircraft defense system in operation with the Republic of China Army.

Description 
The Antelope system employs a battery of four Sky Sword I (TC-1) missiles mounted atop a wheeled vehicle (such as a truck or humvee). The system can either be employed as a stand-alone point defense system or as part of an integrated area air defense system.

The Antelope system collectively includes targeting, guidance, communications components as well as the missiles themselves. It was developed beginning in 1995 as an outgrowth of the  Tien Chien-I missile development program.  The precise operating range of the Antelope system is variously reported as 9 km, 18 km, and "4 miles". The system has a crew of two, one gunner and one observer. The system can be controlled from the truck's cabin or from a mobile control console that can be located up to 70m away from the vehicle to increase operator safety and survivability.

The Antelope system's TC-1L interceptors employ infrared guidance and the system is similar in design to the United States-made Chaparral system which historically was a mainstay of Taiwan's SHORAD network.
It can be used to intercept low-flying helicopters, fighter aircraft, attack aircraft, and bombers. The system can engage targets on the move.

CS/MPQ-78 radar 
The system's CS/MPQ-78 radar was developed in the early 1990s and is a 3D pulse doppler radar with full look down-shoot down capability. Max radar range is 46.3km and ceiling is 30,480m.

See also
 Sea Oryx
 Sky Bow
 HQ-16
 HQ-17
 Multi-Mission Launcher

External links
 Manufacturer's video:

References 

Surface-to-air missiles of the Republic of China
Self-propelled anti-aircraft weapons
Military vehicles introduced in the 1990s